Winona is a city in and the county seat of Winona County, in the state of Minnesota.  Located in bluff country on the Mississippi River, its most noticeable physical landmark is Sugar Loaf. The city is named after legendary figure Winona, who some sources claimed was the first-born daughter of Chief Wapasha of the Dakota people. The population was 25,948 at the 2020 census.

History

The city of Winona began on the site of a Native American village named Keoxa.  The seat of the Wapasha dynasty, Keoxa was home to a Mdewakanton band of the eastern Sioux.

European immigrants settled the area in 1851 and laid out the town into lots in 1852 and 1853.  The original settlers were immigrants from New England.   The population increased from 815 in December, 1855, to 3,000 in December, 1856.  In 1856 German immigrants arrived as well.  The Germans and the Yankees worked together planting trees and building businesses based on lumber, wheat, steamboating and railroads. Between 1859 and 1900, some 5,000 Poles and closely related Kashubians emigrated to Winona, making up one quarter of the population. Since 80% of them were Kashubians, Winona became known as the "Kashubian Capital of America". As a result of the influx of Polish Catholic immigrants, the Church of St. Stanislaus (now Basilica of St. Stanislaus Kostka) was built. For a time, Winona had more millionaires than any other city of its size in the United States.

The railroad and steamboat transportation industries helped Winona grow into a small city that diversified into wheat milling, and lumber production. In 1856, more than 1,300 steamboats stopped at Winona. Winona then had the second operational railroad in Minnesota, after the St. Paul and Pacific Line from Saint Paul to St. Anthony Falls. In December 1870, the Mississippi River was bridged at Winona by the Winona Rail Bridge. In 1892, a wagon toll-bridge over the Mississippi, a steel high-bridge, was completed and remained in service until the opening of the Main Channel Bridge in 1942.

Winona has two historic districts listed on the National Register of Historic Places that combine into a single local historic district administered by the city's Heritage Preservation Commission.

A bandshell was completed in 1924 for outdoor musical performances and events. The Winona Municipal Bands holds concerts there during the summer.

Geography
Lock and Dam 5A spans the Mississippi River in Winona. The highway bridge connecting Winona to the Wisconsin side of the river is at approximately River Mile 726 (USACE map 31).

Winona's primary suburbs are Goodview, Stockton, Minnesota City and Rollingstone to the west, Homer to the southeast and Bluff Siding is 3 miles directly across the interstate bridge to the north and Fountain City  to the north. Rochester is 44 miles to the west of Winona, La Crescent is 21 miles to the south, and La Crosse is 30 miles to the southeast.

Winona is part of the driftless area that includes southeastern Minnesota, northeastern Iowa, southwestern Wisconsin and northwestern Illinois.

Latsch Island

Just northeast of the city, connected to Winona via a number of bridges, is Latsch Island. Officially part of the city since 1998, Latsch Island has been home to a unique community of houseboat ("Boathouse") residents for several decades.

Climate
Winona's weather station records the warmest climate of any in Minnesota, with a normal year-round average (1971–2000) temperature of 48.9 °F, (9.38 C°) compared to 43.2° (6.22 C°) in Austin to the city's southwest or 45.4° (7.44 C°) in Minneapolis, to the northwest, which experiences a strong urban heat island effect.  Temperatures are generally very mild by Minnesota standards year-round; the January mean is 17.6° (-8 C°), while that of July is 75.8° (24.33 C°). Winona has a humid continental climate (Dfa) with hot, humid summers and cold, snowy winters.

Micropolitan area
The United States Office of Management and Budget has designated Winona as the principal city of the Winona, MN Micropolitan Statistical Area (µSA).

Demographics

2020 census
As of the census of 2020, the population was 25,948. The racial makeup of the city was 89.3% White, 2.8% Black or African American, 2.2% Asian, 0.3% Native American, 1.3% from other races, and 4.2% from two or more races. Ethnically, the population was 3.2% Hispanic or Latino of any race.

2010 census
As of the census of 2010, there were 27,592 people, 10,449 households, and 5,022 families residing in the city. The racial makeup of the city was 93.0% White, 1.9% African American, 0.3% Native American, 2.9% Asian, 0.5% from other races, and 1.3% from two or more races. Hispanic or Latino of any race were 1.7% of the population.

There were 10,449 households, of which 20.7% had children under the age of 18 living with them, 36.4% were married couples living together, 8.5% had a female householder with no husband present, 3.2% had a male householder with no wife present, and 51.9% were non-families. 35.6% of all households were made up of individuals, and 12.6% had someone living alone who was 65 years of age or older. The average household size was 2.24 and the average family size was 2.84.

The median age in the city was 26.7 years. 14.4% of residents were under the age of 18; 33.2% were between the ages of 18 and 24; 18.5% were from 25 to 44; 20.5% were from 45 to 64; and 13.3% were 65 years of age or older. The gender makeup of the city was 47.3% male and 52.7% female.

2000 census
As of the census of 2000, there were 27,069 residents. The racial makeup of the city was 94.47% White, 1.13% African American, 0.23% Native American, 2.65% Asian, 0.01% Pacific Islander, 0.47% from other races, and 1.03% from two or more races. Hispanic or Latino of any race were 1.35% of the population.

Ancestries: German (43.2%), Norwegian (15.5%), Polish (14.8%), Irish (13.0%), English (5.5%), French (3.6%).

There were 10,301 households, out of which 23.9% had children under the age of 18 living with them, 40.4% were married couples living together, 8.4% had a female householder with no husband present, and 48.3% were non-families. 35.2% of all households were made up of individuals, and 12.8% had someone living alone who was 65 years of age or older.  The average household size was 2.27 and the average family size was 2.94.

In the city, the population was spread out, with 18.0% under the age of 18, 27.5% from 18 to 24, 22.2% from 25 to 44, 18.0% from 45 to 64, and 14.2% who were 65 years of age or older.  The median age was 29 years. For every 100 females, there were 88.7 males.  For every 100 females age 18 and over, there were 85.1 males.

The median income for a household in the city was $32,845, and the median income for a family was $48,413. Males had a median income of $31,047 versus $23,302 for females. The per capita income for the city was $16,783.  About 6.5% of families and 17.3% of the population were below the poverty line, including 11.5% of those under age 18 and 10.7% of those age 65 or over.

Transportation
U.S. Highway 14, U.S. Highway 61, Minnesota Highway 43 and Wisconsin State Highway 54 are the main routes into the city. Interstate Highway 90 is located a short distance south of the city.

Winona was once served by four railroads; Milwaukee Road, Chicago & North Western, Chicago Great Western and Green Bay & Western, with the Burlington Route trains stopping at a station across the river in Wisconsin. Only the former Milwaukee Road station remains and is now served by Amtrak's Empire Builder daily in each direction between Chicago and Seattle and Portland. The Milwaukee Road is now owned by Canadian Pacific, as is the Dakota, Minnesota & Eastern, which operates the former Chicago & North Western line from Winona to the west.

The Winona Transit Service provides public bus transportation six days per week. The city is also located along the Mississippi River Trail, and the Flyway Trail connects the city to nearby trail systems in Wisconsin. Winona Municipal Airport - Max Conrad Field serves general aviation in the area. It was once served by one passenger airliner, Mississippi Valley Airlines until the mid-1970s.

Economy
Winona is home to the headquarters of the Watkins Corporation, Fastenal, Thern Inc., Knitcraft Corporation, RTP Company, We-No-Nah Canoe, United Building Centers, Badger Equipment Company, Winona Lighting, Hal Leonard Music, WinCraft Sports, and Winona Pattern & Mold. Bay State Milling operates a grain processing facility in Winona and was founded there in 1899.

Winona is also known as the stained glass capital of the United States. Winona is the setting of the Civil War era romance novel, Ladyslipper by Winona native, Donna G. Weber (1951–2012).

Top employers
According to the City's 2011 Comprehensive Annual Financial Report, the top employers in the city are:

Government and politics
Winona is located in Minnesota's 1st congressional district, represented by Brad Finstad, a Republican. At the state level, Winona is located in Senate District 28, represented by Republican Jeremy Miller, and in House District 28A, represented by Democrat Gene Pelowski. Nearby House District 28B is represented by Greg Davids, a Republican. Scott Sherman is mayor.

Education

Winona became the site of the first normal school west of the Mississippi in 1858 with the establishment of Winona Normal School (now Winona State University). This was the beginning of Winona's tradition as a center of higher education. In 2018-2019, Winona State University (WSU) had approximately 7,200 undergraduate students and 560 graduate students. WSU is part of the Minnesota State college system.

Saint Mary's College (now Saint Mary's University) was founded as a private Catholic, Lasallian school in 1912. Later, as the necessary opportunity of higher education for women became apparent, the College of Saint Teresa was created. After Saint Mary's became co-ed in 1969, Saint Teresa closed down in 1988, and its facilities are now used, owned, and/or operated by Saint Mary's University of Minnesota, Winona State University, and Cotter High School. Minnesota State College Southeast also has a campus in Winona.

There is a diverse variety of K-12 educational opportunities. Run by Independent School District 861, the local public school system includes five elementary schools (three in the city of Winona), the Winona Middle School, and the Winona Senior High School. The Winona Area Catholic Schools system includes St. Mary's primary school, St. Stanislaus Elementary School, Cotter Junior High School, and Cotter Senior High School.  St. Martin's School, St. Matthew's School, and Hope Lutheran High School are private Lutheran schools in Winona. Two charter schools, Winona Riverway Learning Community (PreK-12) l, and Bluffview Montessori Charter School (K-8) are located in the city. Bluffview is notable as the first charter Montessori and the second charter school overall in the United States.

Main Square Montessori (MSM) is a nonprofit Montessori learning center for children from the ages of 16 months to six years old in a partnership between the Hiawatha Education Foundation and Cotter Schools.

Several organizations also provide community education.  The Minnesota Conservatory for the Arts offers community classes for early childhood through 55+ adult programs in the areas of dance, music, theater, and visual arts.  Winona Area Public Schools, Winona State University, The City of Winona Parks and Recreation, and Winona Arts Center  offer additional community learning opportunities.

Media

Print
Winona has two newspapers: the Winona Daily News, a daily morning paper; and the Winona Post, a semi-weekly paper with mid-week and Sunday editions.

Television
Winona receives TV signals from neighboring cities, including several channels each from La Crosse, Rochester, Eau Claire, and the Twin Cities, although what can be received depends on the location within the area, as the extensive system of valleys and ridges may block any or all signals. There is one local public broadcasting TV network, HBCI, which is available only to subscribers of the HBC cable company.

Radio

FM

AM

Notable people 
Carol Bartz, former CEO of Yahoo!, formerly of Autodesk
Charles H. Berry, first Attorney General of Minnesota
Bernhard Brenner, Founder/President of Knitcraft Corporation, manufacturer of St. Croix luxury knitwear 
Paul Breza, Roman Catholic priest and founder of Winona's Polish Cultural Institute and Museum
Robert Henry Brom, Roman Catholic bishop
Alec Brown, NBA player
Elliott Heath, distance runner
Garrett Heath, distance runner
Roger Busdicker, co-founder of Hal Leonard Corporation
Jan Romuald Byzewski OFM, pastor of Saint Stanislaus Kostka Parish and founder of the Polish-language newspaper Wiarus
Tracy Caulkins, swimmer, three-time Olympic gold medalist
Max Conrad, aviator
James Earle Fraser (1876–1953), sculptor, designer of the Buffalo Nickel and the "End of the Trail" statue
Paul Giel, athlete, two-time Big Ten Player of the Year, member of College Football Hall of Fame
Mabel Farrington Gifford, expert on speech defects and disorders
James "J. R." Keller, state senator and representative
Bob Kierlin, businessman and politician
Alphonse Roy Lejk, politician
John G. McMynn, Wisconsin Superintendent of Public Instruction
William D. Mitchell, United States Attorney General under presidents Calvin Coolidge and Herbert Hoover
Thomas H. Moodie, North Dakota governor
Anne Pellowski, author, educator, and Kashubian American activist
Benjamin H. Randall, American politician and businessman, early settler to Minnesota Territory
Winona Ryder, actress
Corey Schell, American professional bowhunter and archer
Charles Peter Schuler, Minnesota state legislator and businessman
Orlando Stevens, member of the state legislatures of Vermont and Minnesota
Tom Stoa, Minnesota state legislator and beekeeper
Eleanor Joy Toll, Los Angeles-area educator and clubwoman
Joseph Ray Watkins, entrepreneur and founder of Watkins Incorporated
Julie Wera, infielder with 1927 New York Yankees
William Windom (1827–1891), member of both the U.S. House of Representatives and U.S. Senate from Minnesota; later Secretary of the Treasury 
Cat Zingano, mixed martial artist
Eugenia Wheeler Goff (1844-1922), historian, cartographer, educator, and author

Sister cities
  Bytów, Pomeranian Voivodeship, Poland
  Misato, Miyagi, Japan

Landmarks

Sugar Loaf is river bluff topped by a distinctive rock pinnacle, which was left after quarrying activity in the 19th century.  It is located at the junction of Highway 61 and Highway 43/Mankato Avenue.
Basilica of Saint Stanislaus Kostka is a historic Catholic church built in 1895 in the Polish Cathedral Style.
Lake Winona is separated from the Mississippi River by downtown Winona. It is surrounded by a park, which contains the Winona Lake Park Bandshell and a recreation center.
Garvin Heights City Park is an overlook of the Mississippi River that is used to view a panorama of the city and surrounding area.
 Merchants National Bank by Purcell and Elmslie the 1858 building on the left side was first an Econofoods opened in June 1992 and permanently closed in April 2012

References

External links

City of Winona, MN – Official Website
Winona Chamber of Commerce
 Visit Winona

 
Cities in Minnesota
Cities in Winona County, Minnesota
Minnesota populated places on the Mississippi River
County seats in Minnesota
Populated places established in 1852
Dakota toponyms
Kashubian-American history
Polish-American culture in Minnesota
1852 establishments in Minnesota Territory